America was a Commercial-free Music channel on XM Satellite Radio that specialized in playing Classic country music. It was available on channel 10 on XM and channel 808 on DirecTV.  America was scrapped as part of the Sirius/XM merger on November 12, 2008, replaced by Sirius's similar channel that is also devoted to Classic Country music, The Roadhouse.

XM's advertising described the channel this way: "We've dimmed the lights, thrown some sawdust on the floor, and brought the honky tonk back to life. Waylon, Willie, Dolly and the whole gang are on hand. The true sound of Country is alive and well....this is America."

Hosts included Dan Dixon ( From Detroit, MI  WNRZ-FM playing rock music & Toledo Ohio WTOD AM 1560 50's-90's Country & K-100  WKKO New Country ), Ray Knight and John Welch.

Programs
The Long Haul, visits the history of country music from the 1950s to the 21st Century.
Bill Anderson Visits with the Legends, Country Hall of Fame member Bill Anderson talks with and looks at the most influential moments and people in the history of country music.
Chartistry, Reviews the country music charts from the past and the present.
Ranger Doug's Classic Cowboy Corral, Douglas B. Green of Riders in the Sky hosts an hour of vintage cowboy music and comedy with his sidekick, Sidemeat (fellow Rider "Too Slim" Fred LaBour).
America presents The Grand Ole Opry, encore presentations of the Grand Ole Opry performances, which aired live on Nashville! XM11.

All For the Hall

XM Satellite Radio is a partner organization with the Country Music Hall of Fame and Museum in its "All For the Hall" membership program. "Bringing together artists, musicians, and anyone who loves and appreciates country music, All For the Hall is dedicated to preserving the legacy of the music that inspires us." ~ America XM10

References

Defunct radio stations in the United States
Digital-only radio stations
Radio stations established in 2001
Radio stations disestablished in 2008